De Vet Du (literally "You Know It" in Swedish) is a Swedish music group formed in 2010 mixing humor and sarcasm in their music. De Vet Du, or at times De vet du started in Lidingö, a suburb of Stockholm by four friends Christopher Martland, Johan Gunterberg, Tor Wallin, and the so-called "DJ Hunk". They were signed to Universal Music Sweden, but are now signed to Giant Records.

Career
Originally the members started online, mainly on YouTube, where they uploaded humorous videos under the title "Lidingobladet" and soon became online sensations. Moving to music and humor they posted their first video "Dansa Är Kul (Men Jag Föredrar Å Supa)" (meaning "Dancing is fun, but I prefer to drink" in Swedish). With further, quite often risqué titles and explicit lyrics (particularly when heard in other languages), they released their debut album Shit Va Pin in 2012 and from that album their charting hit "Fucka Ur", which charted on Sverigetopplistan, the official Swedish Singles chart. It was followed up by another charting single, "Kär i en kändis", in 2013.

Their regular online postings, filled with tongue in cheek humor, puns and self-deprecating hilarious criticism of social phenomena, attracted a big following. These includes releases such as "BoyBand", the album Shit Va Pin, "Hon va en han", "Sture P", "Bågar Utan Glas" and "Din Syrra". They also cooperate with other people and habitually feature them in their music videos, like in "Haterz", featuring Robert Aschberg and "Dansa Är Kul (Men Jag Föredrar Å Supa)" featuring Robin Svensson, etc.

In popular culture
De Vet Du is featured in Björn Borg commercials, particularly the memorable "Boxers or Briefs" series.

Discography

Studio albums

Extended plays

Singles

Other charted songs

Notes

References

External links
Shit Va Pin -- De Vet Du official website
De Vet Vu YouTube channel
De Vet Du channel on Kanal5Play

Swedish-language singers
Swedish musical groups
Swedish comedians
Swedish comedy musicians
Swedish comedy troupes
Melodifestivalen contestants of 2017